Agrupación Deportiva Cartaya is a football team based in Cartaya. Founded in 1956, the team plays in Regional Preferente de Huelva. 

The club's home ground is Nuevo Luís Rodríguez Salvador.

History
After the 2009–10 season, they were relegated two divisions, from Tercera División to Regional Preferente, due to the club's economic limitations.

Season to season

9 seasons in Tercera División

Notable former players
 Camilo Nvo
 Alejandro Marañón

References

External links
Official website
lapreferente.com profile

Association football clubs established in 1956
Football clubs in Andalusia
Divisiones Regionales de Fútbol clubs
1956 establishments in Spain
Province of Huelva